Kota Puteri is a township in Gombak District, Selangor, Malaysia, developed by the PKNS. The town is alternately known as Bandar Baru Batu Arang. It is divided into 12 sections.

Location
Kota Puteri is roughly halfway between Rawang and Kuala Selangor. It is situated close to the Selayang–Kuala Selangor constituency border.

Access

Car
Kota Puteri is served primarily by Jalan Batu Arang  which interchanges into Kepong–Kuala Selangor Highway Federal Route 54 on its western end. The township is also served by the LATAR Expressway on the southern boundary.

Public transportation
Selangor Omnibus 100 to MRT/KTM Sungai Buloh and Kuala Selangor.

External links
pknsproperty.com/KotaPuteri
pkns.gov.my

Gombak District
Townships in Selangor